A graded numerical sequence, sometimes called an n/n+1 saying or numerical heightening, is a literary form employed in the Hebrew Bible. It is found especially in Proverbs, Job, and Amos, and is used to list attributes, compare items, and catalogue sins.

Examples

Use and meaning
This form is used in Ugaritic literature, but not in Ancient Egyptian literature. It occurs 38 times in the Old Testament, as well as in Ecclesiasticus and Sirach.

Graeme Goldsworthy suggests that this formula "points to the open-ended nature of the list, thus inviting the perceptive person to supply further items." Wilfred Watson notes that the graded numerical sequence is sometimes used for climactic effect, as in Proverbs 30:19.

References

Hebrew Bible